Science and Life may refer to:

Science and Life (Russian) (Nauka i Zhizn), a Russian science magazine
Science & Vie, a French science magazine
Science and Life (book), a 1920 book by Frederick Soddy